Hans Küppers (24 December 1938 – 15 December 2021) was a German footballer who played as a midfielder. He spent six seasons in the Bundesliga with TSV 1860 Munich and 1. FC Nürnberg. He also represented West Germany seven times, including two UEFA Euro 1968 qualifiers against Yugoslavia and Albania and five friendlies.

Küppers died on 15 December 2021, at the age of 82.

Honours
 UEFA Cup Winners' Cup finalist: 1964–65
 Bundesliga: 1965–66; runner-up 1966–67
 DFB-Pokal: 1958–59, 1963–64

References

External links
 

1938 births
2021 deaths
German footballers
Association football midfielders
Germany international footballers
Bundesliga players
Schwarz-Weiß Essen players
TSV 1860 Munich players
1. FC Nürnberg players
FC Lugano players
Footballers from Essen
West German footballers
West German expatriate footballers
West German expatriate sportspeople in Austria
West German expatriate sportspeople in Switzerland
Expatriate footballers in Austria
Expatriate footballers in Switzerland